Metriorhynchoidea is an extinct superfamily of thalattosuchian crocodyliforms from the Early Jurassic to the Early Cretaceous (Toarcian - Valanginian, possibly as late as early Aptian) of Europe, North America and South America. Metriorhynchids are fully aquatic crocodyliforms. Named by Fitzinger, in 1843, it contains the basal taxa like Teleidosaurus, Zoneait and Eoneustes and the family Metriorhynchidae. An unnamed taxon is known from Chile.

Phylogeny 
Metriorhynchoidea is a stem-based taxon defined in 2009 as the most inclusive clade consisting of Metriorhynchus geoffroyii, but not Teleosaurus cadomensis. The cladogram below follows the topology from a 2011 analysis by Andrea Cau and Federico Fanti. Note that the same topology was obtained in Mark T. Young and Marco Brandalise de Andrade, 2009 and Mark T. Young, Stephen L. Brusatte, Marcello Ruta and Marco Brandalise de Andrade, 2010.

References

Middle Jurassic crocodylomorphs
Early Cretaceous crocodylomorphs
Vertebrate superfamilies
Prehistoric marine crocodylomorphs
Late Jurassic crocodylomorphs
Early Jurassic first appearances
Early Cretaceous extinctions
Thalattosuchians